Uyama Hiroto is a Japanese record producer, DJ, composer, arranger and close collaborator of the late Japanese DJ, record producer, composer and arranger Nujabes. His style of music is a blend of heavy downtempo and ambient-jazz influenced hip-hop. For the album Chill SQ he created a remix of the song "Theme of Love" from the video game Final Fantasy IV.

Discography

Albums

Compilations/Albums he appears on

References

External links
 ROPH Recordings.
 Twitter
 Last.fm

Hip hop record producers
Japanese hip hop musicians
Living people
Japanese jazz musicians
Nu jazz musicians
Year of birth missing (living people)